Henry's Moat is a hamlet and parish in Pembrokeshire, Wales, in the community of Puncheston. The nearest railway station is Clarbeston Road  to the south. It was in the ancient Hundred of Cemais.

Name
The parish's Welsh name was Castell Hên-drêv (or Hendre), Anglicised by early English settlers to its present form. It derives from an ancient tumulus surrounded by a moat. It appears as Castel henrye on a 1578 parish map of Pembrokeshire.

History
In 1833 the population of the parish was 282. It includes the hamlet of Tufton on the nearby B4329 Cardigan to Haverfordwest turnpike.

Church
The parish church is dedicated to St Brynach (English: St Bernard).

References

External links

Villages in Pembrokeshire
Puncheston